Paytakht is a popular Iranian TV series portraying the life of a Mazandarani family in Aliabad village.

It ran for six seasons and ninety-eight episodes over the course of nine years (2011–2020) premiering during each Nowruz, the Persian New Year, with the exception of Paytakht 4 that began in the Ramazan of 2015. The comedy series is directed by Siroos Moghaddam, and Mohsen Tanabandeh is the author and the main actor of this series.

Plot

Paytakht Season 1 (2011)
A family from the town of Aliabad in Mazandaran are planning to move to Tehran, the capital of Iran. After arriving, they find the previous owner of the home laying dead in his bed. Legal issues caused from his death prevent the family from settling into their home, forcing Naghi Mamouli and his family to live in his cousin Arastou's truck. During the time the Mamouli family live in the truck, they find themselves in strange and confusing events. Shortly after settling into their new home in Tehran they find out that their house will be demolished to make a new road. The family decide that Tehran is not for them and decide to move back to the Aliabad village

Paytakht Season 2 (2013)
Naghi (Mohsen Tanabandeh) goes to work one day and receives an assignment from his boss. Naghi must transport a newly made dome and two minarets to Qeshm Island in the south of Iran, to build a mosque there for the residents. He takes his family, his cousin Arastou (Ahmad Mehranfar), and a young woman named Miss Fadavi, who is an acquaintance of Naghi's boss. They all agree to take the dome and minarets to Qeshm in Arastou's truck. Miss Fadavi becomes a love interest for Arastou, resulting in many awkward but funny moments during the week long journey.

Paytakht Season 3 (2014)
Arastou 'falls in love' with a young girl by the name of Miss Tehrani. He wants to hold his wedding at Naghi's home but the home is still under construction. Naghi lets him hold the wedding there anyway, and ignores his worker Mousa's request to build a pillar underneath the house to prevent it collapsing. On the night of the wedding, disaster strikes and the house collapses during the celebrations. Many people are injured and this ends Arastou's short lived marriage. These series of events result in Naghi losing his job and falling into depression. Naghi and Musa are forced to live in the home of his sister, Fahimeh. To give him a boost, Naghi decides to enter a national tournament in wrestling, his greatest passion. He loses badly to an elderly man by the name of Sohanpaz, causing his depression to become worse and becomes the laughingstock of Mazandaran.

During Naghi's cycle of depression, his cousin Arastou reveals to the family that he is engaged to a Chinese woman by the name of Cho Chung, or Raheleh after she converted to Islam. This centers the story around her, and how she travels all the way to Tehran in order to surprise Arastou, causing many troubles along the way. Although they have an argument after Arastou failed to tell her about his previous marriage, they are madly in love and plan to hold their wedding in Turkey.

It is revealed that due to Sohanpaz becoming injured, Naghi is now the new contender for the international wrestling championship, to be held in Tehran in a matter of days. He rushes to the stadium to train and finds out he has to lose around 7 kilograms in order to compete in his weight class. Naghi shows determination that had not been seen from him in months. He loses the weight thanks to a very strict diet from his coach and qualifies for the tournament. Thanks to help of his family and friends, Naghi wins the championship finals, beating the United States, Russia, and China for 1st place.

Paytakht Season 4 (2015)
The Mamouli family face a new set of challenges after Arastou's wife Cho Chung dies in the MH370 plane crash. The season is set one year after the crash, however Arastou is still devastated and continues to mourn her death. Over the year, Arastou has grown out his beard and hair in mourning, alongside wearing black clothes. Naghi has done the same in support of his cousin. However, Naghi becomes tired of his appearance and urges Arastou to end his mourning, trim his beard, and begin to wear his colorful clothes once again.

Meanwhile, Naghi's wife Homa becomes a city council member of Aliabad after winning a landslide election. Although Naghi is proud of her, he fears her work life may start to distance her from the family. He begins to despise the city council after Homa begins monitoring his behavior in order to prevent him from embarrassing her with his antics. Homa's position in the city council becomes a huge problem when Naghi begins to plan the construction of his sister Fahimeh's new home. After Naghi and Homa realize the new home is positioned in an illegal territory, they become opposed to each other. Naghi defies the law and continues to build the house for his sister, while Homa implores to them to stop construction as the home will soon be demolished by the city council. Many friends and family help to build the house over the course of many episodes.

Arastou is informed by the police that Malaysia Airlines will be paying a sum of $400,000 to him for the death of his wife. When he goes home, he tells no-one and is unhappy from the notion of profiting from the death of his wife. However, the news spreads quickly to Naghi, who is disappointed by the fact that he found out from his friend Rahmat rather than Arastou himself. Although Naghi is not interested in the money, he feels betrayed by Arastou since he was never told by him, causing small commotion.

After all the controversy of Fahimeh's house, the city council finally finds out and sends a bulldozer to the house to demolish it. After much commotion with government officials, police, and a crowd of residents, Naghi pours gasoline on himself and points a lighter to himself, threatening to set himself on fire if his family is not left alone. This causes Homa to collapse and suffer a heart attack from the shock. Naghi drops everything and accompanies Homa to the hospital, where the fate of the house is left uncertain. The gasoline is revealed to be only water. Naghi and Homa make up and decide to go on a trip to Mashhad with the family, to the excitement of Baba Panjali.

Paytakht Season 5 (2018)

After Behboud had been missing in Africa for a long period of time during his trip, he is considered dead. his son Behtash returns from military service and starts appearing, however it upsets him when he sees Rahmat flirting with his mother Fahimeh.

The Mamouli family is in a car crash with Arastou, this upsets Naghi and separates Naghi and Arastou for a period of time.
During the family's trip to Turkey, they get in an accident while in a balloon ride and are left stranded in Syria. together with the help of another Syrian family and a former ISIS conscript Elizabeth, they try to find their way out of the ISIS zone.

Paytakht Season 6 (2020-2021)

Several months have passed. Panjali has recently died due to dispnea during a meal, and all of his organs are donated. Naghi retires wrestling from FILA and becomes a private driver of Mr. Maleki - the city's parliamentary representative. Homa has been accepted as an anchorwoman on IRIB Mazandaran. Behtash is the 4th goalkeeper of Nassaji FC. He has wore a rugby hat, similar to Peter Cech, due to a similar injury. Behboud returns from Somalia with Alien Hand Syndorme. Arastoo has been released after a nearly 1-year imprisonment, he starts working for a dealer after he would threat Arastoo he would tell the police if he does not follow his order. Behtash receives an offer from Panathinaikos F. C for a large sum of money, Although he does not tell anyone. After a year of the Covid-19 Pandemic, major drama is brought upon the family, Homa father passes from Coronavirus from Naghi which could lead to imprisonment for him. Rahmat is married with Triplets, Arastoo is under house-arrest, and Behdasht is injured making him take time off sports, this leads to lots of financial issues for the family.

Cast and characters

Main

 Mohsen Tanabandeh as Naghi Mamouli
 Rima Raminfar as Homa Saadat, Naghi's wife
 Ahmad Mehranfar as Arastou Amel, Naghi's cousin
 Alireza Khamseh as Panjali, Naghi's father (S1-5)
 Sara & Nika Forghani as Sara & Nika Mamouli, Naghi's daughters
 Nasrin Nosrati as Fahimeh, Naghi's sister
 Bahram Afshari as Behtash Fariba, Naghi's nephew, son of Fahimeh (S5-)/ Shirafkan, Behboud brother(S2)
 Hooman Haji-Abdollahi as Rahmatollah Amini-e shalikar-e hezarjaribi, a friend of Naghi and Arastou (S2-6)
 Mehran Ahmadi as Behboud Fariba, Fahimeh's husband (S2-3, S6)
 Mostafa & Mojtaba BalalHabashi as Rahman & Rahim, Rahmat's twin brothers (S3-6)
 Salman Khatti as Taghi, Naghi's brother (S2-)
 Abolfazl Rajabi as Behrouz, Behboud's son. (S6-)

Recurring
 Samira Hassanpour as Golrokh (S1)
 Pouria Poursorkh as Masoud Kabiri (S1)
 Pejman Bazeghi as Police (S1)
 Linda Kiani as Sho'le Fadavi (S2)
Amir Jafari as himself (S2)
Javad Khiabani as himself (S3-6)
 Hedayat Hashemi as Mousa, the plaster worker (S3-4)
 Meng Han Zhang as Chu (Raheleh) Chang (S3)
 Mohammad Reza Alimardani as Abdulfattah Baou, Homa's rival in council elections
 Mahya Dehghani as Soosan, Mousa's daughter (S4)
 Niloofar Rajaeifar as Elizabeth, an ex-ISIS maiden (S5)
 Amir Seyedzadeh as Mr. Maleki, the parliamentary representative (S6)
 Atieh Javid as Jamileh, Taghi's wife (S6)
 Majid Vasheghani as Siamak
 Alireza Haghighi as himself (S6)
 Behnam Bani as himself (S6)
 Pedram Faizi in the role of Little Ali

Awards 
 Paytakht 1: Best television series of 2005–2017 IRIB TV1 - The poll Sin Mesle SerialBest Comedy Series in Jaam-e Jam TV Festival
 Paytakht 2: Best television series in Nowrouz - The poll Soroush Publishing Company
 Paytakht 3: Best Screenplay & Best Director & Best Actor Award - IRIB Launched in 2014Attractive series The poll Hamshahri Newspaper with 86% vote
 Paytakht 4: Best television series in Ramadan - The poll Soroush Magazine with 201 pointsBest Actor & Best Actress in a Comedy - The 16th Hafez Awards
 Paytakht 5: Best television series in Nowrouz
 Paytakht 6: Winner of the statuette of the best male comedian (Mohsen Tanabandeh) from the twentieth celebration of Picture World (Hafez Awards)

Reception

Positive reactions 

This series has been accompanied by a positive reaction from the audience and has been able to gain many fans. But, it has been criticized by some critics. Also, due to the death of the influential writer in the series (Khashayar Alvand), he was not present in the sixth season and the season received about its script.

Negative reactions

Ahmad Ali Moghimi, in a letter addressed to Zarghami, expressing his strong protest against the "Capital 3" series and the elites of Mazandaran, said: "Capital 3" series has done the most ridiculous thing possible to make the audience laugh and is trying to make its audience laugh by mocking the zealous people of Mazandaran.

Censored 
There were censorships in this series, which were protested by the agents and actors of the series. The height of censorship was in the fifth and especially the sixth season.

Mohsen Tanabandeh after censorship of sixth season said:

There is the same difference between earth and sky between our Paytakht and the Paytakht you see.

References

Sources 
 Stage adaptation of “Paytakht” to tour Canada U.S. and Europe

External links
 
 "Iran’s Aristotle searches for his Chinese wife" - TODAYonline

Iranian drama television series
2010s Iranian television series
2011 Iranian television series debuts
Persian-language television shows
Islamic Republic of Iran Broadcasting original programming
Television shows set in Iran